The Ellingson Farm District near Hillsboro, North Dakota is a farm that was developed in 1882.  It was listed on the National Register of Historic Places in 1985.  It then included nine contributing buildings, a contributing site, and a contributing structure on its .

References

Farms on the National Register of Historic Places in North Dakota
1882 establishments in Dakota Territory
Historic districts on the National Register of Historic Places in North Dakota
National Register of Historic Places in Traill County, North Dakota